John Carmichael (born July 2, 1957) is an American politician. He has served as a Democratic member for the 92nd district in the Kansas House of Representatives since 2013.

Early life 
Carmichael was born in Wichita, Kansas. He graduated from Wichita State University and from the University of Kansas law school. He resides in Riverside, Kansas. He earned degrees from Wichita State University and the University of Kansas law school. He was appointed to the Governor’s Committee on Kansas Libraries by Governor Joan Finney.[1]

Career 
Carmichael practices law in Wichita, a city in Southcentral Kansas. He has held a number of civic positions including serving as the former chair of the Kansas Commission on Peace Officer Standards and Training, the former State Secretary, Kansas Democratic Party, the former chair of the Kansas Fourth Congressional District Democrats, the former chair of the Kansas Human Rights Commission.[1] In 2006 he was the founder of the Sedgwick County Voter Protection Poll Monitoring Program. He is an adjunct member of the faculty of Wichita State University.

Tenure
When the Republican supermajority houses of the legislature passed a billion dollar tax exemption for an unnamed corporation in an unrevealed industry, Carmichael's facetious comment was that for all the legislature and public knew, the state might be subsidizing "a pornographic film production studio" and roles for adult-film actors and camera crews. He continued. "The problem is, you don't know what kind of business you are betting your constituents' tax dollars and futures on."

House Committee Assignments
2021-2022
Administrative Rules and Regulations Committee, Ranking Minority Member
Corrections and Juvenile Justice Committee
Energy, Utilities, and Telecommunications Committee
House Judiciary Committee, Ranking Minority Member

Elections 
In 2016 and 2018, Carmichael won uncontested Democratic primary and general elections in House District 92, without opposition. In 2020 he was again unopposed in the primary, and won the general election with 57.6% of the vote against Republican Patrick Mahoney.

Personal
Carmichael lives in the Riverside district of Wichita, Kansas, in Sedgwick County, Kansas.

References

1957 births
Living people
Democratic Party members of the Kansas House of Representatives
21st-century American politicians
Wichita State University alumni
University of Kansas alumni